Koskovo is a rural locality (a village) in Staroselskoye Rural Settlement, Vologodsky District, Vologda Oblast, Russia. The population was 5 as of 2002.

Geography 
Koskovo is located 23 km southeast of Vologda (the district's administrative centre) by road. Borborino is the nearest rural locality.

References 

Rural localities in Vologodsky District